Macksburg can refer to a place in the United States:

 Macksburg, Iowa, in Madison County
 Macksburg, Ohio, in Washington County
 Macksburg, Oregon, in Clackamas County